Atticus Matthew Cowper Ross (born 16 January 1968) is an English musician, record producer, composer, and audio engineer. Along with Trent Reznor, he won the Academy Award for Best Original Score for The Social Network in 2010. In 2013, the pair won a Grammy Award for Best Score Soundtrack for Visual Media for their soundtrack to The Girl with the Dragon Tattoo. In 2021, alongside Jon Batiste, they won the Golden Globe and Academy Award for the soundtrack for Pixar's Soul.

Ross began working with Reznor on the latter's side project Tapeworm in 2002. He later worked with Reznor's band Nine Inch Nails, first as a programmer and producer in 2005, and became the only official member of the band outside of Reznor in 2016.

Early life 
Atticus Matthew Cowper Ross was born in the Ladbroke Grove area of London on 16 January 1968, the son of Roxana Lampson and Ian Ross. His father was a founder of Radio Caroline. He has five siblings, including fashion model Liberty Ross and fellow musician Leopold Ross. His maternal grandfather was diplomat Miles Lampson, 1st Baron Killearn, his great-grandfather was Italian pathologist and bacteriologist Aldo Castellani, and his uncle is British-American journalist Charles Glass. Ross was educated at Eton College, where he was a few years below future UK Prime Ministers David Cameron and Boris Johnson, and later at the Courtauld Institute of Art.

Career

Music 
Ross came to notice in the mid-1990s as a programmer for Tim Simenon's Bomb the Bass during the period of the albums Unknown Territory and Clear. He worked on a number of production and remix projects with Simenon, as well as forming a collaborative relationship with Barry Adamson. He programmed The Negro Inside Me and Oedipus Schmoedipus, and produced As Above So Below before forming his own band, 12 Rounds, with his wife Claudia Sarne and Adam Holden. They released two albums, Jitterjuice and My Big Hero. A third full-length album was produced by Trent Reznor, but was ultimately never finished. Three songs from that album have since been released on the band's website.

Ross moved to the United States in 2000, and as of 2002 was working alongside Reznor for his side project Tapeworm. He has been credited as a producer and/or programmer on the Nine Inch Nails albums With Teeth, Year Zero, Ghosts I–IV (on which he was a co-writer), The Slip, and Hesitation Marks. He has worked with Reznor in numerous other capacities, including work with Saul Williams and Zack de la Rocha, and they co-produced tracks for a reformed Jane's Addiction with Alan Moulder in 2009.

Other work has included two co-productions with Joe Barresi, the Loverman EP Human Nurture and Coheed and Cambria's Year of the Black Rainbow, as well as albums for Korn. He has also produced tracks or created remixes for such artists as Grace Jones, Perry Farrell, and Telepathe. In May 2010, he appeared in a cryptic video and was named as a member of a secret project, later revealed to be How to Destroy Angels, a collaboration between Reznor and his wife Mariqueen Maandig. In 2016, Ross composed an original score titled 'The Journey' for FIFA 17 new single-player story campaign mode. In 2020, he co-produced and co-wrote one track on Jehnny Beth's To Love Is to Live. In 2021, Ross and Reznor produced and co-wrote Halsey's album If I Can't Have Love, I Want Power.

Film and television scores 
Ross' work in film music began in 2004 when he scored the Hughes Brothers' TV series Touching Evil with his wife Claudia Sarne and brother Leopold Ross. He has since provided music for two further Hughes Brothers projects: Allen Hughes' vignette in the film New York, I Love You, and Ross' first feature film, The Book of Eli (2010). The latter's score was released through Reprise Records on 12 January 2010. It won at the BMI Awards and earned Ross a nomination as "Discovery of the Year" at the 2010 World Soundtrack Awards.

On 1 July 2010, Reznor announced that he and Ross were scoring David Fincher's new film The Social Network. The film's soundtrack was released on 28 September 2010, and was highly praised. On 16 January 2011, they won the Golden Globe Award for Best Original Score for their score to The Social Network. On 27 February, they received the Academy Award for Best Original Score for The Social Network. Ross and Reznor again collaborated on the soundtrack to Fincher's 2011 film Girl With the Dragon Tattoo. In 2013, the pair won the Grammy Award for Best Score Soundtrack for Visual Media for their Girl with the Dragon Tattoo soundtrack.

Ross was slated to work on the 2013 samurai epic 47 Ronin, but was soon replaced by Javier Navarrete. Ross and Reznor again teamed up with Fincher to score his 2014 film Gone Girl. In 2016, Ross and Reznor, along with composer Gustavo Santaolalla and the band Mogwai, collaborated to create the score to the documentary film Before the Flood.

In June 2017, Ross, along with Reznor, Maandig, Robin Finck, Joey Castillo, and Alessandro Cortini, appeared as "The Nine Inch Nails" in Episode 8 of Twin Peaks: The Return on Showtime, performing an alternative live rendition of the song "She's Gone Away" which previously appeared on Nine Inch Nails' 2016 EP Not the Actual Events.

In 2021, Reznor, Ross, and Jon Batiste won the Golden Globe for the soundtrack for Soul.

Personal life 
Ross and his wife, singer Claudia Sarne, have three children and live in Los Angeles.

Works

Musical scores

Film

Television

Video game

Nine Inch Nails 
With Teeth (2005) (Production and programming)
Year Zero (2007) (Production and programming)
Ghosts I–IV (2008) (Songwriter, production and programming)
The Slip (2008) (Production and programming)
Hesitation Marks (2013) (Production, programming, arranging and engineering)
Not the Actual Events (2016) (Production, performer and songwriter)
The Fragile: Deviations 1 (2016) (Production)
Add Violence (2017) (Production, performer and songwriter)
Bad Witch (2018) (Production, performer and songwriter)

Production 
No Jahoda – Jahoda Witness
Korn – See You on the Other Side (also co-writing)
Korn – Untitled
Coheed and Cambria – Year of The Black Rainbow (with Joe Barresi)
Perry Farrell – "Go All the Way (Into the Twilight)"
Loverman – Human Nurture (with Joe Barresi)
Lil Nas X – "Old Town Road" (also co-writing)
 Jehnny Beth – To Love Is to Live (also co-writing)
 Halsey – If I Can't Have Love, I Want Power (with Trent Reznor)

Programming 
Bad Religion – Beyond Electric Dreams
Barry Adamson – Oedipus Schmoedipus, The Negro Inside Me
From First To Last – The Levy
P!nk – Try This
Saul Williams – The Inevitable Rise and Liberation of NiggyTardust! (2007)
Bomb the Bass – Clear

References

External links 

 Nine Inch Nails' site
 
 

 
1968 births
Alumni of the Courtauld Institute of Art
Animated film score composers
Annie Award winners
Best Original Music BAFTA Award winners
Best Original Music Score Academy Award winners
British people of Italian descent
British trip hop musicians
Dark ambient musicians
Golden Globe Award-winning musicians
Grammy Award winners
English expatriates in the United States
English hip hop musicians
English industrial musicians
English film score composers
English male film score composers
English people of Italian descent
English record producers
How to Destroy Angels (band) members
Living people
Musicians from London
Nine Inch Nails members
People educated at Eton College
Place of birth missing (living people)
Primetime Emmy Award winners